Kensi Marie Blye (portrayed by Daniela Ruah) is a fictional character in the show NCIS: Los Angeles. She is a Junior Field Agent in the NCIS Office of Special Projects Team stationed in Los Angeles. She first appeared in the NCIS season one episode "Identity".

Casting 
Kensi was originally named "Kensi Lo" and described as "a twenty-something Asian-American whose academic record in forensics and criminology got her recruited young by the Feds"; a change was needed when Portuguese actress Daniela Ruah was cast. Like G. Callen, Sam Hanna, Eric Beale and Nate Getz, Kensi was first introduced in the backdoor pilot "Legend" from NCIS.

Background

Personal background 
Kensi Marie Blye was born in San Diego, California on July 29, 1982. She came from a U.S. Marine Corps family. At some point her father was stationed at Camp Lejeune during her childhood. She is fluent in Portuguese, French, and Spanish, can lip-read and knows Morse code. In the episode "Borderline" she also stated that her father taught her how to "track, shoot, fix an engine, play poker, wire a house; basically, anything you teach a son", and that her father was her best friend. In that same scene she reveals that her "father didn't have any sons, just me" implying that she is an only child. She has admitted to having Chaetophobia (fear of hair), specifically fear of men's back hair. She collects gel bracelets and is known to have at least seventy-two. She is also known to be a slob; her desk is frequently covered in clutter and her home is shown to be quite messy. Her untidy habits are a recurring joke throughout the series.

When she was fifteen years old and out seeing the movie Titanic with friends, a movie Kensi considers to be her favourite, her father was murdered. His body was so unrecognizable that he had to be identified through the use of dental records. It had been a cold case for many years, but in the episode "Blye, K., Part 2," it was finally solved, and Kensi was able to move on with her life at last.  It was subsequently revealed that after her father's murder, she spent almost a year living on the streets.

Professional background 
Kensi joined the Naval Criminal Investigative Service in August 2006, according to her NCIS agent biography form from "Black Market" after having graduated from Cornell University with a BA in Politics and International Studies. According to the form, her first posting was the Washington DC Office, December 2006 to September 2007, then Tokyo 7th Fleet HQ from October 2007 to March 2008.  After that she was stationed at Norfolk Naval Base, Virginia from March 2008 to June 2009. She started at OSP in Los Angeles in June 2009.

In "The Only Easy Day", Kensi says that when she was the new girl, she had to climb through air ducts because she was the smallest, and also had to wear bikinis on assignment when needed. She is very talented with undercover work, and Callen and Sam have called her a "natural operator". She is fluent in Spanish, Portuguese, English, and French. Her husband is Martin Deeks.

Storylines

Season 1 
On-screen, her first partner was Agent Dom Vail. She was particularly upset when Dom went missing, and she was seen afterwards washing dishes at his apartment. Kensi has been officially partnered with Marty Deeks since season two, although their first experience working together was in the season one episode "Fame."

Season 2 
It is revealed in the season two episode "Disorder" that she was once engaged to a Marine named Jack, but that their relationship ended after his return from Iraq suffering from posttraumatic stress disorder (PTSD) and his subsequent disappearance. Kensi tried to be there for him (stating that she helped with his medication, and even went to his psychiatric appointments), but all of her efforts weren't enough since Jack was too affected. It is said that he eventually left her without even telling her. She is even shown crying in the interrogation room to the suspect (proving that she obviously had a deep connection to him, and is still greatly affected by the loss). Although Deeks and Kensi have a somewhat antagonistic relationship at first, they have warmed up considerably over time, and she was visibly concerned when Deeks was shot in the episode "Personal". Kensi asks Hetty if she can stay with Deeks in the hospital rather than assist in the investigation of his shooting, as she didn't want to risk not seeing him alive again, as had happened with Vail. Deeks is also a flirter, and he has demonstrated some interest in Kensi on a personal level. In the episode "The Job", while undercover, she had to flirt with a good-looking thief. Deeks showed jealousy, as noted by Callen and Sam.

Kensi is visibly annoyed sometimes when Deeks flirts with other women or when he attempts to use her as a wingman. During some episodes, though, Kensi appears slightly jealous when Deeks flirts with other women or when they come across someone, he once had feelings for while undercover. Over time it becomes obvious that Kensi is developing feelings for Deeks, though she often hides them. Like Deeks, Kensi also has a comic book collection. In the season two episode "Plan B" Kensi earns the nickname Wikipedia for her encyclopaedic knowledge. In the season two finale, Kensi resigns from NCIS along with Callen and Sam in order to follow Hetty's trail to Prague without Director Vance's authorization.

Season 3 
In the season three episode "Blye, K.", Kensi falls under investigation when Marines from her dead father's sniper unit end up dead in various car accidents. Kensi's father Donald Blye was part of a special operations unit named "Oscar-Sierra". She is taken into custody by Assistant Director Granger when it is revealed that she was the last person a few Marines contacted before their deaths, although her name is eventually cleared when it becomes apparent that the true killer is a former member of her father's sniper unit who faked his own death. In season four, Hetty tells Deeks that Kensi lived on the streets for about a year after her father's death. This event appears to have scarred her emotionally, although she has never gone into details as to the events that took place while on the streets. In "Blye, K., Part 2", it is revealed that her mother (remarried as Julia Feldman) lives in Encino and they haven't spoken in 15 years. In the same episode, it is revealed that Kensi joined NCIS in 2006, nine years after the death of her father. She was 24 years old at the time. Granger accuses Kensi of joining NCIS to fulfill her own agenda, i.e. to investigate her father's death. Donald Blye died trying to protect an American journalist named Brad Stevens who was about to expose Peter Clairemont (chief of the Oscar-Sierra unit) who had killed a civilian while intoxicated. At the end of the episode, much to Kensi's surprise, it was revealed that her father and Granger were close associates.

Kensi also has an affinity for dubstep and techno music.  Deeks mentions it early on in season three, and she is found listening to it while undercover in episode 22 of season three, "Neighbourhood Watch." Kensi also made a guest appearance in the Hawaii Five-0 episode "Ka Hakaka Maika'i" where she announced that she has Level 5 security clearance.

Season 4 
In the episode "Parley", while Deeks is undercover with a woman named Monica, Kensi appears jealous of how close Monica is to him. While Kensi is preparing Monica for a meeting with an arms dealer, Monica asks whether being Deeks' partner is enough for her. Kensi seems uptight and tries to avoid answering the question. Monica then goes on to tell her that he can't be trusted; Kensi defends Deeks by saying "I trust him with everything". Later Kensi goes to talk to Deeks and he asks her if she is good. She replies by saying she is good and asks Deeks the same question. He replies by saying "I'm good if you're good". Though they both say everything is fine between them, they both seem to be lying and are obviously not fine. By the end of the season, Deeks and Kensi finally begin to confront their true feelings for each other and share their first real kiss.

Season 5 
In this season, Kensi and Deeks finally begin to truly confront their romantic feelings for each other, but face various obstacles that continue to keep them apart or discuss their true feelings. In the opening episode of season five, Kensi is both comforted and deeply affected by the fact that Deeks used her as a tether to withstand the torture he had endured. While Deeks is recovering, Kensi states that she attempted to bring him his favorite doughnut/croissant (a.k.a. "Cronut").  She is clearly distraught by his lack of response, even to this gesture. After Nate is called to assess Deeks' mental status, it is Kensi who is finally able to give him the sleep he has thus far been unable to attain, when she goes to visit him at his house. In the episode "Recovery", it is implied that Kensi and Deeks have become intimate after he told her he wanted to be with her at his apartment and she stared at him before walking off, with him following right behind her. However, following their night together in the episode "Frozen Lake", things become awkward and full of tension when their entangled emotions begin to have an effect on their performance during field work. When Deeks does not take a most-needed shot, Kensi becomes agitated and tells Deeks she is standing on a "frozen lake" and that while she wants what they have more than anything else, it just won't work. Despite this, at the end of the episode, Kensi tells Deeks they'll find a way to work things out between them, admitting they have a "thing", before asking him to be patient with her as they talk things through. He agrees to that, and they make plans to meet again that night. As Kensi waits for Deeks later on, though, Hetty tells her she has been reassigned to a new and classified mission and will have to leave until the job is finished, much to her disappointment. As she prepares to leave, she receives a text message from Deeks saying he is almost there. She appears genuinely upset and walks off.

In Afghanistan, she receives her mission: to kill an American man who uses the alias "White Ghost". She discovers that the "White Ghost" is apparently Jack Simon, her ex-fiancé. Simon had PTSD returning from the war and left her on Christmas morning (season two "Disorder"). Because of her personal connection, she is unable to kill him and eventually gets captured. It is revealed that this was a plan crafted by Hetty to protect Jack, who is innocent, from the CIA. When the team hears news of Kensi's capture they rush to her aid, only to find her pale, weak and having been very severely beaten. This is a direct parallel to what Deeks went through at the beginning of season five. Kensi prefers not to talk about it, although she does confide in Deeks and he embraces her when she says, "It was really bad." (The Afghanistan storyline was actually not originally part of the plan for season 5, but added to keep Blye on the show despite actress Ruah's pregnancy.)

Season 6 
In season six episode 11 "Humbug", she and Deeks agree to make their relationship official and finally become a couple. They attempt to keep their relationship secret until the events of episode 18 "Fighting Shadows" when the team reveal their awareness of their newfound romantic relationship. In the same episode, Kensi and Deeks are also briefly separated and must work with Callen and Sam respectively, but later discover the reason being that Deeks is under investigation by the LAPD who will try and use their relationship against them.

Season 7 
In season seven, Kensi decides to move in with Deeks.

Towards the end of the season, Callen, Sam, Kensi and Deeks go to the desert to capture a terrorist and their plane gets shot down and, in the wreckage, Kensi gets stuck under the nose of the plane and goes into a coma. The aftermath of the injury results in a spinal cord injury with a very slim chance of recovery.

Season 8 
In the first episode, Kensi gets injured because the team was involved in a helicopter crash. For the first half of the season, Kensi is out of action in hospital, recovering and doing therapy following her accident. After months of physical therapy, she does eventually return to work, once Hetty and Nate both agree she is ready. In episode 14, Kensi is kidnapped by a man she met in physical therapy (who is later revealed to have been one of the people she shot in Season 5 during her trek into Afghanistan, making her directly responsible for his amputation). In episode 15, she is taken to a house where the man threatens to cut off her leg as "payback" but Deeks saves her. At the end of the season finale, Kensi asks Deeks to marry her, and he says yes.

Season 9 
In season nine, Kensi and Deeks are officially engaged and begin planning for the wedding while at the same time meet executive assistant director, Shay Mosley who replaces Owen Granger. Mosley is shown to disapprove of Kensi and Deeks' relationship when she sends Deeks back to work at the LAPD, temporarily breaking their partnership until Callen convinces Mosley to keep Deeks on the team. Throughout the season, Kensi and Deeks continue making plans and preparations for their wedding and at the same time, start discussing their future together beyond NCIS with Deeks expressing his hopes of someday leaving with Kensi to start a family together. During the season, Kensi is faced in a deadly and highly dangerous situation involving a nuclear launch and almost risking her life. Kensi is successful in stopping the threat.

In the season nine finale, Kensi along with the rest of the team, learn the truth about Mosley's kidnapped son and Callen's promise to help her when they come into contact with a suspect on a current case who is connected to Mosley's former lover, Spencer Williams. Upon learning of this information, Mosley sees this as her best chance of finding and getting her son back. Mosley and the team learn they are located in Mexico, but the mission to rescue her son is unsanctioned and highly dangerous, putting the team's lives at risk. Kensi wishes to go to Mexico, but Deeks has concerns and does not believe it is a good idea. When Deeks is fired by Mosley after confronting her about her unfair, reckless and disrespectful behaviour, he believes that now is the time for him and Kensi to finally leave NCIS. However, despite their previous discussions on the matter, Kensi reveals that she is not ready to leave NCIS or start a family yet. A fight ensues between them, resulting in the wedding being called off. Despite being fired as well as the current state of their relationship, Deeks still joins the team on the Mexico mission to save Mosley's son. However, while the mission is ultimately successful, reuniting Mosley with her son and returning them to L.A. together, the rest of the team are struck by a rocket while escaping in their SUV, leaving uncertain who is dead or alive.

Season 10 
Shortly after the events from the season nine finale, Kensi and the team are revealed to have survived the impact from the rocket that hit their SUV. Kensi is the least injured member of the team but, becomes extremely worried when Deeks has since remained unconscious following the SUV explosion. The team are forced to separate, and Kensi drags an unconscious Deeks through the desert to find safety and shelter, but Kensi continues to remain worried about Deeks. Eventually, Deeks awakens, and Kensi manages to get to a hospital. Kensi reunites with Turk and together they stand guard and get ready for a fight from Spencer Williams men who are still hunting the team. Thankfully, help arrives, and Kensi remains by Deeks' side as he is being treated from his injuries. By the end of the premiere, Kensi and Deeks finally reconcile from their previous fight from the season nine finale, getting back together and resuming their engagement.

Kensi and Deeks continue to plan their wedding throughout the season and later open up their bar. Towards the end of the season, Kensi and Deeks's wedding day has arrived. However, Kensi remains unaware of the events regarding Anatoli Kirkin and while the rest of the team deals with the situation, Kensi is busy getting ready along with her friends and mother until Anatoli reveals himself to her. Kensi later finds herself having to fight against Anatoli's former bodyguards. Finally, Kensi and Deeks get married and become husband and wife with Hetty officiating the ceremony.

Season 11 
Early in the beginning of the season, Kensi briefly believes that she might be pregnant, until she later learns it was a false alarm, but the experience causes Kensi and Deeks to finally have a real discussion about having children. Throughout the season, Kensi and Deeks happily adjust to married life and continue to hold a strong and healthy relationship as well as managing the bar, finally naming it, "The Squid and Dagger". Later, after Deeks walks into a trap and almost dies in bomb explosion, the event causes Kensi to finally admit and realize she truly wants to have children with him. Since then, they have been trying to get pregnant.

Season 12 
In the season, Kensi and Deeks are ready to start a family together when they begin to strongly consider fertility treatments to get pregnant. However, they begin struggling financially when Deeks’s position as the LAPD liaison is terminated due to police reform. Problems rise further when David Kessler (Frank Military), a sociopath Kensi put in jail years ago is released from prison via a Presidential Executive Order.

References 

Television characters introduced in 2009
Fictional Naval Criminal Investigative Service personnel
NCIS (TV series) characters
NCIS: Los Angeles characters
Crossover characters in television